Lonely Are the Brave is a 1962 American black and white Western film adaptation of the Edward Abbey novel The Brave Cowboy directed by David Miller from a screenplay by Dalton Trumbo and starring Kirk Douglas, Gena Rowlands and Walter Matthau.

Kirk Douglas plays cowboy Jack Burns, Gena Rowlands portrays his best friend's wife and Walter Matthau appears as a sheriff who sympathises  with Burns but must do his job and chase him down. The picture also features an early score by composer Jerry Goldsmith. Douglas said repeatedly that this was his favorite film of his own work.

Plot

John W. "Jack" Burns is a veteran of the Korean War who works as a roaming ranch hand, much as the cowboys of the old West did, refusing to join modern society. He rejects most of modern technology and carries no identification, such as a driver's license or draft card. He cannot even provide the authorities with a home address because he just sleeps wherever he finds a place.

As Burns crosses a highway into a town in New Mexico, his horse Whiskey has a difficult time crossing the road, confused and scared by the traffic. They enter town to visit Jerry. She is the wife of an old friend, Paul Bondi, who has been jailed for giving aid to illegal immigrants. Jack explains his dislike for a society that restricts a man on where he can or can't go, what he can or can't do.

To break Bondi out of jail, Burns decides he himself needs to get arrested. After a violent barroom fight against a one-armed man, in which he is forced to use only one arm himself, Burns is arrested. When the police decide to let him go, he deliberately punches a cop to get himself re-arrested. He is now facing a probable sentence of a year in jail, which allows him to see Bondi, with the aim of helping him escape. The town is in a sleepy border area and the cops are mostly bored, occasionally dealing with minor offenses. The Sheriff, Morey Johnson, has to compel them to pay attention to their duties at times.

Joining Bondi in jail, Burns tries to persuade him to escape. He tells Bondi he couldn't spend a year locked up because he'd probably kill someone. Burns defends Bondi from the attention of sadistic Deputy Sheriff Gutierrez, who picks Burns as his next target. During the night the inmates saw through one of the jail's bars using two hacksaw blades Burns had hidden in one of his boots. The deputy summons Burns in the middle of the night and beats him. On returning to his cell Burns tries to persuade Bondi to join him in escaping. Bondi has accepted his two-year sentence knowing he has a family waiting and has too much at stake to become a fugitive from the law. He therefore decides to remain, and Burns breaks out by himself, returning to Bondi's house, where he picks up his horse and some food from Bondi's wife. After the jail break the Sheriff learns that Burns served in the military during the Korean War, including seven months in a disciplinary training center for striking a superior officer. He also received a Purple Heart and a Distinguished Service Cross with oak leaf clusters for his valour during battle.

Burns heads for the mountains on horseback with the goal of crossing the border into Mexico. The police mount an extensive search, with Sheriff Johnson and his Deputy Sheriff Harry following him in a jeep. A military helicopter is brought in, and when the aircrew locates Burns they relay his location to the sheriff. Whiskey is repeatedly spooked by the helicopter, so Burns shoots the tail rotor, damaging it and causing the pilot to lose control and crash land.

Deputy Gutierrez also chases Burns. He sees the horse and is preparing to shoot when Burns sneaks up, knocking him unconscious with his rifle butt. Burns leads his horse up impossibly difficult, rocky slopes to escape his pursuers, but the lawmen keep on his trail, forcing him to keep moving. Surrounded on three sides, Burns' horse refuses at first to climb a steep slope. They finally surmount the crest of the Sandia Mountains and escape into the east side of the mountains, a broad stand of heavy timber, with the lawmen shooting at him. The Sheriff acknowledges that Burns has evaded their attempts to capture him. Burns is shot through the ankle during his dash to the timber.

Burns tries to cross Highway 66 in Tijeras Canyon during a heavy rainstorm on Whiskey but the horse gets spooked by the traffic and blinded by the lights. A truck driver strikes Burns and Whiskey as they are attempting to cross the road. The sheriff arrives and, asked by the state police if Burns is the man he has been looking for, says he can't confidently identify him, because he's never seen the man he is looking for up close. Both seriously wounded, Burns is taken away in an ambulance and Whiskey is humanely put down.

Cast

Kirk Douglas as John W. "Jack" Burns
Gena Rowlands as Jerry Bondi
Walter Matthau as Sheriff Morey Johnson
Michael Kane as Paul Bondi
Carroll O'Connor as Truck Driver
William Schallert as Harry (Johnson's deputy)
George Kennedy as Gutierrez (sadistic deputy)
Karl Swenson as Rev. Hoskins (prison inmate)
Bill Mims as First Deputy Arraigning Burns 
Martin Garralaga as Old Man
Lalo Ríos as Prisoner
Bill Bixby as Helicopter Pilot (uncredited)
George Keymas as Deputy (uncredited)
Harry Lauter as Deputy in Canyon (uncredited)
Bill Raisch as One Arm (uncredited)
Dan Sheridan as Deputy Glynn (uncredited)

Production
Lonely Are the Brave was filmed after Kirk Douglas read Edward Abbey's novel The Brave Cowboy and convinced Universal Pictures to produce it with him in the starring role:

It happens to be a point of view I love. This is what attracted me to the story – the difficulty of being an individual today.

Douglas assembled the cast and crew through his production company, Joel Productions, recruiting ex-blacklisted writer Dalton Trumbo, who had written Spartacus two years before, to write the screenplay.

The movie was filmed in the area in and around Albuquerque, New Mexico: the Sandia Mountains, the Manzano Mountains, the Tijeras Canyon and Kirtland Air Force Base.

The working title for the film was "The Last Hero," but the release title of the film was a matter of contention between the studio and Douglas, who wanted to call it "The Brave Cowboy" after the novel. Douglas wanted the film to open in art houses and build an audience, but Universal chose to market the film as a Western, titling it "Lonely Are the Brave" and opening it widely without any particular support. Despite this, the film has a cult following, and is often listed as one of the best Westerns ever made.

Miller directed the picture with a reverent and eloquent feeling for the landscape, complementing the story arc of a lone and principled individual tested by tragedy and the drive of his fiercely independent conscience.

Lonely Are the Brave premiered in Houston, Texas on 24 May 1962.

President John F. Kennedy watched the movie in the White House in November 1962. In his memoir Conversations with Kennedy, Ben Bradlee wrote, "Jackie read off the list of what was available, and the President selected the one [film] we had all unanimously voted against, a brutal, sadistic little Western called Lonely Are the Brave."

Soundtrack
The score to Lonely Are the Brave was composed by Jerry Goldsmith.  Goldsmith's involvement in the picture was the result of a recommendation by veteran composer Alfred Newman who had been impressed with Goldsmith's score on the television show Thriller and took it upon himself to recommend Goldsmith to the head of Universal Pictures' music department, despite having never met him.

Cast notes
Bill Bixby has a small part as an airman in a helicopter, his first film appearance.
It is one of the first film appearances of Carroll O'Connor (TV's All in the Family).
Bill Raisch is the one-armed man who fights with Douglas in a barroom brawl scene. The following year Raisch began appearing with David Janssen in the TV series The Fugitive.

Awards and honors
Kirk Douglas was nominated for a 1963 BAFTA Award as "Best Foreign Actor" for his work in Lonely Are the Brave, and placed third in the Laurel Awards for "Top Action Performance". The Motion Picture Sound Editors, USA gave the film a "Golden Reel Award" for "Best Sound Editing" (Waldon O. Watson, Frank H. Wilkinson, James R. Alexander, James Curtis, Arthur B. Smith), in a tie with Mutiny on the Bounty.

The film is recognized by American Film Institute in these lists:
 2008: AFI's 10 Top 10:
 Nominated Western Film

Quotes
Jerry Bondi (Gena Rowlands): "Believe you me, if it didn't take men to make babies I wouldn't have anything to do with any of you!"
Jack Burns (Kirk Douglas): "Know what a loner is? He's a born cripple. He's a cripple because the only person he can live with is himself. It's his life, the way he wants to live. It's all for him. A guy like that, he'd kill a woman like you. Because he couldn't love you, not the way you are loved."
Jack Burns: "A westerner likes open country. That means he's got to hate fences. And the more fences there are, the more he hates them." Jerry Bondi: "I've never heard such nonsense in my life." Jack Burns: "It's true, though. Have you ever noticed how many fences there're getting to be? And the signs they got on them: no hunting, no hiking, no admission, no trespassing, private property, closed area, start moving, go away, get lost, drop dead! Do you know what I mean?"
Jack Burns: "I don't need [identification] cards to figure out who I am, I already know." This line was used by the fugitive sailor in The Death Ship, the 1926 novel by B. Traven.

References

External links

1962 films
1962 Western (genre) films
American black-and-white films
American Western (genre) films
Bryna Productions films
1960s English-language films
Films based on American novels
Films based on Western (genre) novels
Films directed by David Miller
Films scored by Jerry Goldsmith
Films set in New Mexico
Films shot in New Mexico
Neo-Western films
Films with screenplays by Dalton Trumbo
Universal Pictures films
Revisionist Western (genre) films
1960s American films